Engelbrektsson or Engelbrektson is a surname. Notable people with the surname include: 

Engelbrekt Engelbrektsson (1390s–1436), Swedish nobleman
Jorian Engelbrektsson (born 1982), Swedish pinball player
Karl Engelbrektson (born 1962), Swedish Army officer, Chief of Army 
Olav Engelbrektsson (c. 1480–1538), Archbishop of Norway